Coryndon is a surname. Notable people with the name include:

Robert Coryndon (1870–1925), British colonial administrator in Africa
 Coryndon Farm
 Coryndon Museum
SS Robert Coryndon, a 1929 British twin-screw passenger and cargo ferry
Shirley Coryndon (1926–1976), British palaeontologist